Robert Nix may refer to:

Robert N. C. Nix Sr. (1898–1987), Congressman from Pennsylvania
Robert N. C. Nix, Sr., Federal Building, formerly known as the U.S. Courthouse and Post Office Building in Philadelphia
Robert N. C. Nix Jr. (1928–2003), Pennsylvania Supreme Court justice
Robert Nix (drummer) (1944–2012), drummer for The Candymen and Atlanta Rhythm Section